The Dance Reduction Agents is the debut album from New Zealand band The Reduction Agents. It was written and produced by James Milne, who also creates music under the pseudonym Lawrence Arabia. It was released simultaneously with the debut Lawrence Arabia album. Both albums were co-released by Milne's own Honorary Bedouin Records and Lil' Chief Records. Two songs from the album ("The Pool" and "80's Celebration") appear in the soundtrack to the film Eagle vs Shark.

Track listing

"Cold Glass Tube" – 4:50
"80's Celebration" – 2:21
"Mississippi Moonshine Girls" – 2:41
"Last Night's Love" – 3:19
"Freeways" – 1:20
"Urban Yard" – 3:02
"Sweet Ingredients" – 3:49
"Our Jukebox Run Is Over" – 3:38
"The Pool" – 2:26
"Waiting For Your Love" - 2:51
"Couldn't Anymore" - 6:47
"Cabinets and Mountaintops" - 3:02

References

External links
The Reduction Agents' MySpace page
Lil' Chief Records

2006 debut albums
Lil' Chief Records albums
The Reduction Agents albums